The Ufa Lenin Museum is a museum devoted to Vladimir Lenin in Ufa, Bashkortostan, Russia.

The museum was established in 1941 by the Government of Bashkortostan. Lenin visited Ufa twice, in February and June 1900. During the second visit, his wife rented a house with a mezzanine at the corner of Zhandarmskaya (now Krupskaya) and Prison (now Dostoevsky) streets in Ufa, where Lenin lived for almost three weeks. In memory of this stay of Lenin in Ufa, it was decided to organize a museum.

It has been reported that since the museum has transferred to Ufa City Administration museum was under threat of closure in 2015.

References

1941 establishments in Russia
Museums established in 1941
Biographical museums in Russia
Buildings and structures in Ufa
Monuments and memorials to Vladimir Lenin
Cultural heritage monuments of federal significance in Bashkortostan
Museums in Bashkortostan